Gun laws in Tennessee regulate the sale, possession, and use of firearms and ammunition in the state of Tennessee in the United States.

Summary table 

Places off-limits even with a Handgun Carry Permit

Carrying of Firearms
Article I, Section 26, of the Tennessee State Constitution reads:

That the citizens of this state have a right to keep and to bear arms for their common defense; but the Legislature shall have power, by law, to regulate the wearing of arms with a view to prevent crime.

State supreme court rulings and state attorney general opinions interpret Section 26 to mean regulation cannot and should not interfere with the common lawful uses of firearms, including defense of the home and hunting, but should only be aimed at criminal behavior. Andrews v. State (1870) and Glasscock v. Chattanooga (1928) defined the meaning of regulating arms. "Going armed", carrying any sort of weapon for offense or defense in public, is a crime, except carrying a handgun for defense is allowed with a state-issued permit. 

Effective July 1, 2021, Tennessee no longer requires a permit to carry a firearm, whether openly or concealed for residents and non-residents. However, the state does still issue permits through the Department of Safety to qualified residents 21 years or 18 years old if the applicant is active duty, reservist, guardsman, or honorably discharged from their branch of service, DD-214 must mention 'pistol qualification' in order to be exempt from 8 hour safety course must have a valid military ID. The length of the term for the initial license is determined by the age of the applicant. If renewed properly and on time, the license is renewed every 8 years. Tennessee recognizes any valid, out-of-state permit for carrying a handgun as long as the permittee is not a resident of Tennessee. Nonresidents are not issued permits unless they are regularly
employed in the state.  Such persons are then required to obtain Tennessee permits even if they have home state permits unless their home state has entered into a reciprocity agreement with Tennessee. Permittees may carry handguns in most areas except civic centers,
public recreation buildings and colleges.  Businesses or landowners posting "no carry" signs may prohibit gun carry on any portion of their
properties. Additionally, per Tenn. Code Ann. 39-17-1351 r.(1) a facially valid handgun permit, firearms permit, weapons permit or license issued by another state shall be valid in this state [Tennessee] according to its terms and shall be treated as if it is a handgun permit issued by this state [Tennessee]).

Vehicle Transportation
A person may carry or transport a firearm within a motor vehicle or boat so long as they lawfully possess the firearm. 

However, if the vehicle is parked in a public or private parking area... 

 The vehicle must be permitted to park in that location
 The firearm or ammunition must be stored in a location away from "ordinary observation"
 If the owner of the firearm is not in the vehicle, the vehicle must be locked or the firearm must be stored in a locked container

You do not break the law if someone observes your weapon in the process of it being stored in accordance with the law.

Preemption
Except for four specific exceptions, Tennessee's preemption statute prevents localities from enacting any new laws regulating the use, purchase, transfer, taxation, manufacture, ownership, possession, carrying, sale, acquisition, gift, devise, licensing, registration, storage, and transportation of firearms and ammunition.  The current statute also preempts any existing local law, ordinance or regulation concerning firearms, ammunition or their components.  The exceptions allow localities to regulate 1) the carrying of firearms by their employees when acting in the course of the employees employment (except as provided in T.C.A. § 39-17-1313); 2) the discharge of firearms within the boundaries of the locality (except where permitted by State Law); 3) the location of a sport shooting range (except as provided in T.C.A. § 39-17-316 and T.C.A. § 39-3-412) and 4) the enforcement of any state or federal law pertaining to firearms and ammunition.  Most aspects of licensed handgun carry are regulated exclusively by the state.

At one time, Tennessee required a purchase permit for a handgun approved by one's city police chief or county sheriff with a fifteen-day waiting period; that was replaced under the federal Brady Act with the Tennessee Instant Check System (TICS). Handguns in Tennessee are defined as having a barrel length of less than twelve inches per T.C.A. § 39-11-106(a)(16).

Some counties have adopted Second Amendment sanctuary resolutions. A statewide sanctuary law was also passed.

References

Tennessee law
Tennessee